Doug Hayward (23 August 1920 – 31 August 2008) was an English professional footballer. He was born in Wellington St. George's. A full back, Hayward began his career with Huddersfield Town in 1939 before joining Bristol Rovers in 1946 but he only played once for Rovers. In 1946 he joined Newport County and went on to make 260 appearances for the club, scoring 11 goals. In 1956 he joined Bath City. He was brother to Basil and Eric Hayward.

References

External links
Post War English & Scottish Football League A – Z Player's Transfer Database profile

1920 births
2008 deaths
English footballers
Bristol Rovers F.C. players
Newport County A.F.C. players
English Football League players
Huddersfield Town A.F.C. players
Association football fullbacks
Bath City F.C. players